Juchandra is a Railway Station in Naigaon East on the Vasai Road-DivaJn.-Panvel Rail Route of Central Railway of the Mumbai Suburban Railway Network.

Juchandra is a Rail Station after Kaman Road Rail Station in the South and before Vasai Road Rail Station in the North. Juchandra Railway Station is closely connected to Western Railway as well through Naigaon Railway Station. Naigaon and Juchandra Rail Stations are well connected by Road through Naigaon-Juchandra Link Road.  
Juchandra Itself is a Part of Greater Naigaon.

Railway stations in Palghar district
Mumbai Suburban Railway stations
Mumbai CR railway division
Transport in Vasai-Virar